Holy Spider is a 2022 Persian-language crime thriller film directed by Ali Abbasi, starring Mehdi Bajestani and Zar Amir Ebrahimi. Based on the true story of Saeed Hanaei, a serial killer who targeted street prostitutes and killed 16 women from 2000 to 2001 in Mashhad, Iran, the film depicts a fictional female journalist investigating a serial killer.

It was selected to compete for the Palme d'Or at the 2022 Cannes Film Festival, where it premiered on 22 May 2022. Zar Amir Ebrahimi won the festival's Best Actress Award. The film was selected as the Danish entry for Best International Feature Film at the 95th Academy Awards, and made the December shortlist.

Plot
The film is entirely set in the Iranian holy city of Mashhad. Journalist Arezoo Rahimi (Ebrahimi) arrives in the city from Tehran to investigate a series of murders of local street prostitutes. The killings follow a pattern, with women picked up from area roundabouts by a man on a motorcycle, taken elsewhere, and strangled with their own headscarves. They are then dumped in local rubbish areas. The serial killer, Saeed Azimi, is introduced from the outset. The film's opening tracks the last evening of one of his victims. Addicted to opium, she solicits a series of clients before concluding with Azimi. They journey to a decrepit apartment complex but she senses trouble and attempts to flee before entering his apartment. Azimi strangles her in the stairwell and then flees with her body on his motorcycle.

Rahimi is depicted as self-directed, sharp in her analysis of evidence, and genuinely concerned about the fate of the murder victims. She arrives in the city alone and must navigate various restrictions placed on women in the holy city. She forms an investigative relationship with a male journalist, Sharifi (Arash Ashtiani), who offers support, but for the most part her dealings with local police are filled with dismissiveness and stonewalling. Sharifi has been in contact with the killer, having been chosen by Azimi as a kind of publicist. Sharifi's recordings and recollections offer Rahimi insight into the motive for murder: Azimi is mercurial, by turns friendly and then explosive, excoriating the prostitutes as corrupt and filthy. He claims to be cleansing the city in the name of Imam Reza, the eighth Shia Imam; he is shown in tears at the Imam's shrine.

Cultural misogyny pervades Rahimi's interactions with men during her investigation. A uniformed detective, Rostami (Sina Parvaneh), at first seems affable before making an unwanted pass and then ridiculing Rahimi's character when rebuffed. A powerful local cleric (Nima Akbarpour) similarly suggests that a loose reputation precedes her. Rahimi makes clear to Sharifi that these insinuations are themselves the product of an unwanted advance—a journalistic supervisor in Tehran demanded after-work contact with Rahimi to further her career. Her position as an outsider informs Rahimi's emotionally difficult interactions with victims' families and, in one case, a preliminary conversation with a prostitute on the night of her murder.

Azimi's personal life is portrayed in some detail. He has three children, a caring wife, and a network of fellow military veterans from the Iran-Iraq War. Emotional pain from his service is evident and he feels a failure for not having achieved martyrdom. Azimi's devotion to his family is contrasted with the brutality of his murders. One killing takes place in his home and is almost interrupted by his wife's arrival. Azimi manages to hastily hide the body in a rug. In the scene's most jarring sequence, Azimi has sex with his wife while spying the foot of his dead victim. Hannaei's adolescent son Ali idolizes him—despite the violence that occasionally reaches the surface in their interactions—and intergenerational imprinting is a key theme of the work.

Eventually, Rahimi and Sharifi are confident enough in the schedule, location, and patterns of the killer to initiate a dangerous trap. Rahimi, dressed as a sex worker open to solicitation, boards Azimi's motorcycle. Sharifi follows by car but loses them in the city's backstreets. Rahimi, armed with a pocket knife and a tape recorder, plans to elicit a confession from the murderer and flee but is easily found out. After a struggle, she manages to escape and make her way to the police with evidence; Azimi is picked up at his home in the following days.

As the case goes to trial, it becomes clear that a large portion of the public support Azimi's brutal crusade against street prostitution, and there is pressure to have him go free. Offered the opportunity to claim madness, Azimi doubles down on his religious motivations, claiming only to be mad for the eighth Imam and for God. The perpetrator being obviously lucid, the court has no choice but to find him guilty and he is sentenced to death. Supporters from the prosecution and his veteran's association visit Azimi in prison, assuring him he will be spirited away in a car on the day of execution. When the time arrives it is clear this was a ruse to keep him quiet and he is hanged, raging and struggling when dragged to the scaffold.

The film ends with a kind moment of goodbye between Rahimi and Sharifi before she boards a bus home. While traveling she reviews video evidence gathered during the case, pausing over an interview with the killer's son, Ali: he proudly describes how his father overpowered and choked his victims, play-acting a killing with his younger sister.

Cast
 Mehdi Bajestani as Saeed Hanaei
 Zar Amir Ebrahimi as Arezoo Rahimi
 Arash Ashtiani as Sharifi
 Forouzan Jamshidnejad as Fatima Hanaei
 Sina Parvaneh as Rostami
 Nima Akbarpour as Judge
 Mesbah Taleb as Ali Hanaei
 Firouz Agheli as Haji
 Sara Fazilat as Zinab
 Alice Rahimi as Somayeh

Production
Abbasi was a student in Tehran when the 2000–01 murders took place and was baffled by the conservative response that heralded Hanaei as a hero, and by how long it took for police to capture him. Abbasi began writing versions of the film shortly after seeing Hanaei interviewed in Maziar Bahari's 2002 documentary . Abbasi said, "In a really strange way, I felt sympathy for the guy, really against my own will. I think there was a psychotic element to the pleasure-seeking aspect of his murders, the twisted sexuality and whatnot, but there was also this strange innocence about him. It was more about how a society creates a serial killer." Initial drafts followed the events more faithfully, but Abbasi eventually deviated from them and invented the character of a female journalist, as he felt the film should focus not only on the killer but on misogyny. Additionally, he found it difficult to research the events due to the passage of time and inaccessibilty of certain documents as well as Hanaei's family, motivating him to shift to a narrative with more fictional elements. Abbasi said:
My intention was not to make a serial killer movie. I wanted to make a movie about a serial killer society. It is about the deep-rooted misogyny within Iranian society, which is not specifically religious or political but cultural. ... Instead of making another movie about different ways a man can kill and mutilate women, we want to underline the complexity of the issue and the stakes on different sides, especially on behalf of the victims. 

The character Rahimi was based on a female journalist who was featured in Maziar Bahari's documentary discussing the case on camera and interviewing Hanaei. Although she was from Mashhad, she didn't investigate the crimes, but she covered the trials and wrote a piece on Hanaei's execution that inspired Abbasi. She wrote that his last words were "this was not our deal," suggesting there was some kind of deal with the authorities.

The film is a co-production between Germany's One Two Films, Denmark's Profile Pictures, Sweden's Nordisk Film Production, and France's Why Not Productions, and Wild Bunch International. The production is 41.36% German, 31.05% Danish, 15.3% French, and 12.29% Swedish.

The development of the film officially started in 2016, which was then boosted by the success of Abbasi's 2018 Border. The filmmakers initially tried to shoot in Iran, but this was abandoned by 2019. A plan was made to shoot in Jordan in early 2020, which had to be pushed back several times because of the COVID-19 pandemic. Then, in late 2020, they decided to move the production to Turkey, where COVID restrictions were looser, but they were stalled by Turkish authorities. Abbasi has said this was because the Iranian government interfered. The production then went back to Jordan, where filming finally commenced in May 2021 and lasted 35 days.

Abbasi said Bajestani was taking an enormous risk by playing the killer. Amir Ebrahimi was initially involved in the film only as a casting director, but was cast as the journalist after an actor dropped out of the role.

Release
The film premiered at the 2022 Cannes Film Festival on 22 May 2022, where it received a seven-minute standing ovation at the end of its screening. It was released theatrically in France by Metropolitan Filmexport on 13 July 2022, in Denmark by Camera Film on 13 October 2022, and in Germany by Alamode Film on 12 January 2023.

In May 2022, Utopia acquired North American rights to the film and released it to select theaters on 28 October 2022, expanding to nationwide US theaters on 13 January 2023. Mubi acquired the film for the United Kingdom, Ireland, Latin America, and Malaysia.

Reception

Critical response

Iranian government
On 29 May 2022, the Cinema Organization of Iran's Ministry of Culture and Islamic Guidance issued a statement condemning the Cannes festival for awarding the film the Best Actress award, calling it "an insulting and politically-motivated move". The statement compared the film to The Satanic Verses and said it "has insulted the beliefs of millions of Muslims and the huge Shiite population of the world".

On 1 June 2022, Minister of Culture and Islamic Guidance Mohammad Mehdi Esmaili said Iran "formally protested to the French government through the foreign ministry". He also said, "If persons from inside Iran are involved with the film Holy Spider, they will surely receive punishment from the Cinema Organization of Iran." 

Amir Ebrahimi told CNN on 3 June 2022 that she had received around 200 threats since winning the Best Actress award at the Cannes Film Festival. "The problem is that they didn't even watch this movie, and they are judging this movie, just from a trailer," she said, attributing the reaction to the lack of freedom of expression in Iran.

Accusations of plagiarism
Ebrahim Irajzad, the director of Killer Spider, a 2020 Iranian film based on the same subject, accused Abbasi of plagiarism and circumventing Iranian censorship in order to make the film sooner, claiming he could have shot it in Iran had he been prepared to wait for government approval like Irajzad had to.

Accolades

See also 
 List of submissions to the 95th Academy Awards for Best International Feature Film
 List of Danish submissions for the Academy Award for Best International Feature Film

References

External links
 

2022 crime thriller films
2020s Persian-language films
Danish crime thriller films
German crime thriller films
Swedish crime thriller films
French crime thriller films
2020s serial killer films
German serial killer films
French serial killer films
Films about real serial killers
Films about violence against women
Films about prostitution in Iran
Films about journalists
Films set in Iran
Films shot in Jordan
Films directed by Ali Abbasi
Film controversies in Iran
Films set in 2000
Films set in 2001
2020s French films